Coleophora weymarni is a moth of the family Coleophoridae. It is found in China (Manchuria).

References

weymarni
Moths of Asia
Moths described in 1942